Frederick Orpen Bower FRSE FRS (4 November 1855 – 11 April 1948) was an English botanist.  He was elected a Fellow of the Royal Society in 1891. He was awarded the Gold Medal of the Linnean Society in 1909 and the Darwin Medal of the Royal Society in 1938.  He was president of the British Association in 1929–1930.

Life
Bower was born in Ripon in Yorkshire the son of Abraham Bower and Cornelia Morris, sister of the eminent botanist, Francis Orpen Morris. He was educated at Repton School in Derbyshire before studying at Trinity College, Cambridge, where he graduated MA in 1877.

In 1880 he acquired a position as assistant lecturer in botany at University College, London under Thomas Huxley. In 1882 he moved to South Kensington as a full Lecturer in botany. During this period he spent time at Kew Gardens studying with Dukinfield Henry Scott. In 1885, he was awarded the chair in botany at the University of Glasgow, and was a professor there until 1925.

Bower never married. When he retired he returned to Ripon, and died there in April 1948.

Memberships
Fellow of the Royal Society of Edinburgh (1886)
Fellow of the Royal Society (1891)
Fellow of the Royal Society of Belgium
Fellow of the Academy of Science of Munich
Fellow of the Royal Danish Society

Honours and awards
He was elected president of the Botanical Society of Edinburgh for 1893–95.
He served as vice president of the Royal Society of Edinburgh 1910 to 1916 and president from 1919 to 1924, receiving the Neill Prize in 1925.

Publications
Practical Botany for Beginners (1894)
The Origin of a Land Flora (1908)
Plant Life of Land (1911)
The Ferns 3 vols. (1923–28)
Plants and Man (1925)
Size and Form in Plants (1930)
Primitive Land Plants (1935)
Sixty Years of Botany in Britain, 1875-1935 (1938)

Archives
The archives for Frederick Orpen Bower are maintained by the  Archives of the University of Glasgow (GUAS).

References

External links 

 NAHSTE: Papers of Frederick Orpen Bower at www.nahste.ac.uk

1855 births
1948 deaths
British botanists
Fellows of the Royal Society
Fellows of the Linnean Society of London
Royal Medal winners
Presidents of the British Science Association
Fellows of the Royal Society of Edinburgh
Presidents of the Royal Society of Edinburgh
Foreign associates of the National Academy of Sciences
Foreign Fellows of the Indian National Science Academy
Members of the German Academy of Sciences at Berlin
Members of the Yorkshire Naturalists' Union